Alsbury is a surname. Notable people with the surname include:

A. Thomas Alsbury (1904–1990), mayor of Vancouver, British Columbia from 1959 to 1962
Juana Navarro Alsbury (1812–1888), nurse for Jim Bowie at the Battle of the Alamo in 1836
Michael Alsbury (1975–2014), American commercial astronaut